During the 2004–05 English football season, Leeds United competed in the Football League Championship, having been relegated from the Premier League at the end of the previous season after 14 years in the top flight. With debts of over £100 million, Leeds were not expected to make a push for an automatic return to the Premiership, with preventing a second successive relegation the priority.

Season summary
In 2004–05 season, Leeds began signing players prepared to accept lower wages. The club were eventually forced to sell both their training ground, for £4.2m, and their Elland Road stadium in the autumn of 2004.

On 21 January 2005, Krasner announced the sale of a 50% stake to Ken Bates for £10m and Bates became the club's new chairman, replacing Krasner. This investment effectively saved Leeds United from going into administration. Bates had previously headed three other league football clubs, most famously Chelsea.

Blackwell was forced to sell most of the remaining players, including Aaron Lennon; somehow he managed to build a team using loan players and experienced professionals nearing the end of their careers. Despite a promising opening day win against Derby County, Leeds's form at the start of the 2004–05 Coca-Cola Championship was little better than in the previous season, and they spent the first half of the campaign looking in serious danger of a second successive relegation. Their form gradually picked up after the club was taken over by Bates and Leeds finished in a relatively safe 14th place.

Kit
Leeds United's home kit was manufactured by Diadora.

Final league table

Results
Leeds United's score comes first

Legend

Football League Championship

FA Cup

League Cup

First-team squad
Squad at end of season

Left club during season

Reserve squad

Transfers

In

Out

  Brian Deane –  Sunderland, 24 March, free
 Barry Corr – released (later joined  Sheffield Wednesday on 19 April)
  Kevin Pressman –  Coventry City, March
  David Batty – retired
  Serge Branco –  Queens Park Rangers
  Jamie Winter –  Aberdeen
  Shaun Allaway

Loaned in

Loaned out

References

Leeds United
Leeds United F.C. seasons
Foot